Holidaybreak Limited is a company based in London which primarily serves customers in the United Kingdom, Republic of Ireland and the Netherlands. It describes itself as "an education, leisure and activity travel group with market leading positions in the UK and other major European markets."  Holidaybreak became a wholly owned subsidiary of former competitor Cox & Kings in July 2011 after a long period of attempting to sell two loss making parts of its business, Explore and Superbreak. Three years later in June 2014, Cox & Kings announced the sale of the camping division of its subsidiary Holidaybreak Ltd, to France’s Homair Vacances, for 89 billion Rs (approx. $145mill).

Brands
Holidaybreak operates under multiple brands, however, the majority of their customer volume is through PGL and through their Meininger Division. Other brands include NST, EST, Travelplus.

PGL

PGL is a children's holiday firm providing educational and residential school trips as well as holiday camps in the United Kingdom.

NST

NST or the NST Travel Group is a British educational travel company specialising in tailor-made tours for schools and colleges.

References

Companies based in the City of Westminster
Travel and holiday companies of the United Kingdom